Cryptopygus is a genus of springtails. Cryptopygus belongs to the Isotomidae family.

Species 
 Cryptopygus agreni (Börner, 1903)
 Cryptopygus albaredai Selga 1962
 Cryptopygus albus Yosii 1939
 Cryptopygus ambus Christiansen and Bellinger, 1980
 Cryptopygus andinus DÌaz & Najt 1995
 Cryptopygus annobonensis Selga 1962
 Cryptopygus anomala Linnaniemi 1912
 Cryptopygus antarcticus Willem, 1901
 Cryptopygus aquae (Bacon, 1914)
 Cryptopygus araucanus Massoud & Rapoport 1968
 Cryptopygus arcticus Christiansen and Bellinger, 1980
 Cryptopygus axayacatl Palacios & Thibaud, 2001
 Cryptopygus badasa Greenslade 1995
 Cryptopygus beijiangensis Hao & Huang 1995
 Cryptopygus benhami Christiansen and Bellinger, 1980
 Cryptopygus binoculatus Deharveng 1981
 Cryptopygus bipunctatus (Axelson, 1903)
 Cryptopygus bituberculatus (Wahlgren, 1906)
 Cryptopygus caecus Wahlgren 1906
 Cryptopygus campbellensis Wise 1964
 Cryptopygus cardusi Selga 1962
 Cryptopygus caussaneli Thibaud 1996
 Cryptopygus cinctus Wahlgren 1906
 Cryptopygus cisantarcticus Wise 1967
 Cryptopygus coeruleogriseus (Hammer, 1938)
 Cryptopygus constrictus (Folsom, 1937)
 Cryptopygus debilis (Cassagnau, 1959)
 Cryptopygus decemoculatus (Salmon, 1949)
 Cryptopygus delamarei Poinsot 1970
 Cryptopygus dubius Deharveng 1981
 Cryptopygus elegans (Cardoso, 1973)
 Cryptopygus elegans (Rapoport & Izarra, 1962)
 Cryptopygus exilis (Gisin, 1960)
 Cryptopygus hirsutus (Denis, 1931)
 Cryptopygus indecisus Massoud & Rapoport 1968
 Cryptopygus indicus Brown 1932
 Cryptopygus insignis Massoud & Rapoport 1968
 Cryptopygus interruptus Schött 1927
 Cryptopygus kahuziensis Martynova 1978
 Cryptopygus lamellatus (Salmon, 1941)
 Cryptopygus lapponicus (Brown, 1931)
 Cryptopygus lawrencei Deharveng 1981
 Cryptopygus loftyensis (Womersley 1934)
 Cryptopygus mauretanica Handschin 1925
 Cryptopygus maximus Deharveng 1981
 Cryptopygus minimus Salmon, 1941
 Cryptopygus nanjiensis Shao, Zhang, Ke, Yue & Yin, 2000
 Cryptopygus novaezealandiae (Salmon, 1943)
 Cryptopygus novazealandia (Salmon, 1941)
 Cryptopygus oeensis (Caroli, 1914)
 Cryptopygus parallelus (Wahlgren, 1901)
 Cryptopygus parasiticus (Salmon, 1943)
 Cryptopygus patagonicus Izarra 1972
 Cryptopygus pentatomus (Börner, 1906)
 Cryptopygus perisi Selga 1960
 Cryptopygus pilosus (Womersley, 1934)
 Cryptopygus ponticus (Stach, 1947)
 Cryptopygus pseudominuta Schött 1927
 Cryptopygus quadrioculatus (Rapoport, 1963)
 Cryptopygus quadrioculatus Martynova 1967
 Cryptopygus quadrioculatus Yoshii 1995
 Cryptopygus quinqueoculatus Izarra 1970
 Cryptopygus reagens Enderlein 1909
 Cryptopygus riebi Barra 1997
 Cryptopygus scapelliferus (Gisin, 1955)
 Cryptopygus separatus (Denis, 1931)
 Cryptopygus sphagneticola (Linnaniemi, 1912)
 Cryptopygus subalpinus (Salmon, 1944)
 Cryptopygus subantarcticus Wise 1970
 Cryptopygus sverdrupi Lawrence 1978
 Cryptopygus tasmaniensis Womersley 1942
 Cryptopygus thermophilus (Axelson 1900)
 Cryptopygus tingus
 Cryptopygus travei Deharveng 1981
 Cryptopygus tricuspis Enderlein 1909
 Cryptopygus tridentatus Handschin 1929
 Cryptopygus triglenus Ellis 1976
 Cryptopygus trioculatus Izarra 1972
 Cryptopygus vtorovi Martynova 1978
 Cryptopygus yosiii Izarra, 1965
 Cryptopygus zenderi (Winter, 1967)

References 

 Queiroz, G.C.; Mendonça, M.C., de 2010: Two new Isotomidae species (Collembola) from Espírito Santo State, Brazil. Zootaxa 2480: 37–44. Preview reference page 
 Wise, K.A.J. 1974: New synonymy in Cryptopygus (Collembola: Isotomidae). Records of the Auckland Institute and Museum, 11: 209-212

External links 
 

 

Springtail genera
Entomobryomorpha